The Russian Philharmonic Orchestra is an orchestra based in Moscow. Recordings of the orchestra have been released on Deutsche Grammophon and Naxos Records, amongst others.

References

Russian orchestras